Denise Mercedes (born October 23, 1991) is an American plus-size fashion model and clothing designer from New Jersey. She has been featured on BuzzFeed, Refinery29, and FabUplus Magazine. Mercedes is known for her clothing line with Rebdolls. She is the founder of the #becauseitsmybody campaign, a collaborative photography campaign that encourages body positivity.

A native of Jersey City, New Jersey, she is of Dominican descent.

Career
Denise Mercedes began modeling when she was 13 years old. She started her career by working as a photography studio receptionist. Mercedes's boss allowed her to model in photoshoots as a hobby, which is where she became accustomed to posing in front of a camera.

When Mercedes was 16 years old, she started submitting her photographs to agencies. Due to modeling agency height standards, it was difficult for Mercedes to receive representation at the time. Despite this, she continued to participate in modeling shoots. In 2012, Mercedes began her fashion blog for plus size women. That is when she began collaborating with different plus size boutiques.

In 2017, Mercedes began a body positivity campaign called #becauseitsmybody, a collaborative photography movement. As a body positivity activist, Mercedes created the campaign to celebrate all body types. The campaign encourages people to submit photographs of themselves with the hashtag "#becauseitsmybody."

Currently, Mercedes continues to model. She has collaborated with clients such as Forever 21, Target, JCPenney, and Rue21. She has also worked with smaller body positive online shops such as Feminine Funk and Curvy Girl Fever. She runs a clothing line with Rebdolls.

References

1991 births
Living people
Plus-size models
Hispanic and Latino American female models
People from Jersey City, New Jersey
Female models from New Jersey
American people of Dominican Republic descent
21st-century American women